Telsonemasomatidae is a family of millipedes belonging to the order Julida.

Genera:
 Telsonemasoma Enghoff, 1979

References

Julida